Luan Garcia Teixeira (born 10 May 1993), simply known as Luan, is a Brazilian footballer who plays as a centre back for Palmeiras.

Career statistics

Honours

Club
Vasco da Gama
Campeonato Carioca: 2015, 2016

Palmeiras
Campeonato Brasileiro Série A: 2018, 2022
Campeonato Paulista: 2020, 2022
Copa do Brasil: 2020
Copa Libertadores: 2020, 2021
Recopa Sudamericana: 2022
Supercopa do Brasil: 2023

International
Brazil
Olympic Gold Medal: 2016
Brazil U20
8 Nations International Tournament: 2012

Individual
Campeonato Carioca Team of the year: 2014, 2015, 2016
Campeonato Brasileiro Série B Best Defender: 2016

References

1993 births
Living people
People from Vitória, Espírito Santo
Brazilian footballers
Association football defenders
Campeonato Brasileiro Série A players
Campeonato Brasileiro Série B players
CR Vasco da Gama players
Sociedade Esportiva Palmeiras players
Copa Libertadores-winning players
Brazil under-20 international footballers
Footballers at the 2015 Pan American Games
Pan American Games bronze medalists for Brazil
Olympic footballers of Brazil
Footballers at the 2016 Summer Olympics
Olympic gold medalists for Brazil
Olympic medalists in football
Medalists at the 2016 Summer Olympics
Pan American Games medalists in football
Medalists at the 2015 Pan American Games
Sportspeople from Espírito Santo